Rickerby is a village in the civil parish of Stanwix Rural, in the City of Carlisle district, in the county of Cumbria, England. It is situated near Carlisle, next to the River Eden. In 1870-72 the township had a population of 97. The property belonged to Richard de Tilliol of Scaleby Castle, whose descendant Adam de Rickerby lived in the village in about 1230. Rickerby Park is nearby.

See also

Listed buildings in Stanwix Rural

References

Further reading 
Hutchinson, William, The History of the County of Cumberland and Some Places Adjacent from the Earliest Accounts to the Present Time (Carlisle: F. Jollie, 1794.), 2:571

External links 
 Cumbria County History Trust: Stanwix (nb: provisional research only – see Talk page)

Villages in Cumbria
City of Carlisle